Krishna III whose Kannada name was Kannara (r. 939 – 967 C.E.) was the last great warrior and able monarch of the Rashtrakuta dynasty of Manyakheta. He was a shrewd administrator and skillful military campaigner. He waged many wars to bring back the glory of the Rashtrakutas and played an important role in rebuilding the Rashtrakuta empire. He patronised the famous Kannada poets Sri Ponna, who wrote Shanti purana, Gajankusha, also known as Narayana, who wrote on erotics, and the Apabhramsha poet Pushpadanta who wrote Mahapurana and other works. His queen was a Chedi princess and his daughter Bijjabbe was married to a Western Ganga prince. During his rule he held titles such as Akalavarsha, Maharajadhiraja, Parameshvara, Paramamaheshvara, Shri Prithvivallabha etc. At his peak, he ruled a vast empire stretching from the Narmada river in the north to the Kaveri river delta in the south. A copper grant of 993 issued by the Shilahara king of Thana  claims the Rashtrakuta control extended from the Himalayas in the north to Ceylon in the south and from the eastern sea to the western seas. The grant states that when King Krishna III mobilised his armies, the kings of Chola, Bengal, Kannauj, Andhra and Pandya regions used to quiver.

Southern invasion
He killed the Western Ganga ruler Rachamalla II and made his brother-in-law Butuga II the king of the Gangavadi territory. He invaded the territory of Gurjara Prathihara and captured Chitrakuta and Kalinjara regions. He even defeated his own family relations, the Kalachuris of Tripuri (Chedi) who had turned against the Rashtrakutas. Later he invaded the southern Deccan and recaptured Kolar and Dharmapuri from the Banas and Vaidumbas who had given shelter to Govinda IV due to his matrimonial relations with the Cholas. Though he initially may have experienced setbacks, Tondaimandalam (northern Tamil regions) was secured by 944. He defeated the Cholas and captured Kanchi and Tanjore, according to the Siddalingamadam plates of 944. 

In c. 949, he defeated the Cholas decisively in a battle of Takkolam in the North Arcot district. Krishna III was helped by his Western Ganga feudatory Butuga II in these campaign. Chola prince Rajaditya Chola was killed "while seated on his elephant with a well-aimed arrow". From the famous Atakur inscription it is known that Krishna III gave Buthuga II extensive Ratta territories near Banavasi in return for this victory. With the fall of the Cholas, he was able to extract tribute from the Pandyas and the Chera ruler of Kerala. He also obtained the submission of the King of Ceylon, extracted tributes from the Manadlika rulers, and erected a pillar of victory at Ramesvaram. This victory is narrated in Somadeva's writing Yashatilaka Champu of 959 as well. 

However, from location of the inscriptions it is argued that Krishna III had full control only of Tondaimandalam (northern Tamil Nadu) as his inscriptions are not found further south in modern Tamil Nadu. After these victories he proclaimed himself "Conqueror of Kacci and Tanjai" (Kanchi and Tanjore). He exerted influence on Vengi (modern Andhra Pradesh) by helping Badapa secure the throne against his competitor Amma II. Later, Danarnava of Vengi became his feudatory.

Northern expedition
While Krishna III focussed on southern Deccan, the Chandelas had captured Chitrakuta and Kalinjar. This prompted Krishna III to send his Western Ganga feudatory Marasimha, son of Buthuga II, to retrieve the lost areas. Marasimha defeated the Gurjara Prathiharas. The northernmost Kannada inscription of the Rashtrakutas, dated about 964 is the Jura record (near Jabalpur) in present-day Madhya Pradesh. The details of these victories are inscribed in this inscription. Two inscriptions of Marasimha, dated 965 CE and 968 CE, state that his forces destroyed Ujjayani (which lies in the Paramara territory of Malwa). Based on this, some historians such as A. S. Altekar conclude that the Paramara king Siyaka must have rebelled against the Rashtrakuta suzerainty, resulting in a military campaign against him. Thus, Marasimha must have also defeated the Paramaras. However, K. N. Sethi believes that Krishna III only targeted the Gurjara-Pratiharas: there is no evidence to show that Siyaka rebelled against Krishna III or faced a battle against his forces.

At his peak, Krishna III ruled an empire that extended from Narmada river in the north and stretched south covering large parts of present-day northern Tamil Nadu in the south. The Prathihara, the Paramara, the Seuna (ruled by Vaddiga) and the northern Kalachuris were his feudatories in the northern Deccan and central India.

This enmity with the northern Kalachuris of Tripuri proved fatal to the empire towards the end of his rule. Krishna III was also perhaps reckless in giving large fiefs (land grants) to his commanders. He gave the province of Tardavadi (present day Bijapur district) sometime before 965 to Tailapa II his Chalukya feudatory right in the heart of his empire. This later turned out to be to the Rashtrakutas' undoing.

Notes

References

External links
 History of Karnataka, Mr. Arthikaje

967 deaths
Hindu monarchs
10th-century rulers in Asia
Rashtrakuta dynasty